Kim Kyul-sil (born 13 April 1982) is a South Korean women's international footballer who plays as a midfielder. She is a member of the South Korea women's national football team. She was part of the team at the 2003 FIFA Women's World Cup. On club level she plays for Yeoju Institute of Technology in South Korea.

References

External links

1982 births
Living people
South Korean women's footballers
South Korea women's international footballers
Place of birth missing (living people)
2003 FIFA Women's World Cup players
Women's association football midfielders
Footballers at the 1998 Asian Games
Footballers at the 2006 Asian Games
Incheon Hyundai Steel Red Angels WFC players
WK League players
Asian Games competitors for South Korea